Saint-Jean-Berchmans Church is a Roman Catholic church in the Petite-Patrie neighbourhood of the Rosemont–La Petite-Patrie borough in Montreal, Quebec, Canada. It is located on Rosemont Boulevard, east of Papineau Avenue.

Church 
Saint-Jean-Berchmans Church was built from 1938 to 1939 based on plans by Lucien Parent and René-Rodolphe Tourville. It is characterized by a Latin cross, a nave with three aisles, and its stone cladding. The church possesses a Casavant Frères organ (opus 1620) dating from its foundation. The church showcases ornamental forged iron by Pancrace Balangero. Balangero was commissioned by the firm Tourville Parent for the work. Balangero was active as an ironsmith in Montreal from 1914 to 1957. His works can be found all over Quebec and Ontario, with examples in Valleyfield, Drummondville, Ottawa and the Montérégie region.

Saint-Jean Berchmans Parish
The parish of St. John Berchmans was formed in 1908 but, because of lack of funds, the church was only completed 30 years later. During this period, religious services were held in a crypt.

Gallery

External links
 Official site 
 Inventaire des lieux de culte du Québec 
 Description de l'orgue de l'église 

Jean-Berchmans
Art Deco architecture in Canada
Jean-Berchmans (Montreal)
Rosemont–La Petite-Patrie
20th-century Roman Catholic church buildings in Canada